Forson Amankwah (born 31 December 2002) is a Ghanaian professional footballer who plays as a right winger for Austrian Bundesliga club Rheindorf Altach, on loan from Red Bull Salzburg.

Career
Amankwah began his career with WAFA. He made his professional debut in a 2019–20 Ghana Premier League fixture against Karela United on 12 December 2019. He was adjourned man of the match in a 4–3 win match against King Faisal on 15 November 2020 

In February 2021, he joined Austrian Bundesliga club FC Red Bull Salzburg and went on loan to FC Liefering.

On 27 June 2022, Amankwah was sent on a one-season loan to Austrian Bundesliga club Rheindorf Altach.

Honours
FC Liefering
 Austrian Football Second League runner-up: 2020–21

References 

2002 births
Living people
Ghanaian footballers
Association football midfielders
Ghana Premier League players
2. Liga (Austria) players
West African Football Academy players
FC Red Bull Salzburg players
FC Liefering players
SC Rheindorf Altach players
Ghanaian expatriate footballers
Ghanaian expatriate sportspeople in Austria
Expatriate footballers in Austria